Sandikuthirai is a 2016 Indian Tamil-language village drama film directed by Anbumathi and starring Rajkamal, Manasa, Hari, and Divya.

Cast
Rajkamal as Ravi
Manasa as Keerthi 
Hari as Hari
Divya as Sudha
Ganja Karuppu
Delhi Ganesh as Sudha's grandfather
Bonda Mani

Production
Television actor Rajkamal made his foray into film as a lead actor after his film Melnaattu Marumagan was delayed.

Reception
Malini Mannath of The New Indian Express opined that "Helmed by a debutant maker and boasting of no big names in the cast or crew, the film delivers more than what one would have expected from it". A critic from iFlicks noted that "Overall, Sandikuthirai fails to attract the audience". A critic from Maalaimalar and Dinamalar criticised the film. A critic from The Times of India Samayam felt that the film had several weaknesses.

References

2016 films
2016 drama films
Indian drama films
2010s Tamil-language films